Gerald "Jerry" Walter McFadden (March 21, 1948 – October 14, 1999), known as The Animal, was an American serial killer and sex offender who was executed in 1999.

Biography
Gerald Walter McFadden was born on March 21, 1948, in Haskell County Texas.

Criminal life
On May 4, 1986, McFadden kidnapped 20-year-old Gena Turner, 19-year-old Bryan Boone, and 18-year-old Suzanne Harrison as they took a trip to Lake Hawkins north of Tyler, Texas. She was found the next day. He was arrested on 6 May, after a police report from a couple he had attacked by the lake on the day of the murder. Three days later, the bodies of Boone and Turner were discovered, with gunshot wounds being the cause of death.

McFadden had been convicted of rape three times between 1972 and 1978, but never had to serve his full sentence. He was released on parole in July 1985. There were several witnesses who had seen McFadden close to the scene of the crime on the day of the killings. Ammunition found in his possession was identified as the same ammunition used in the killings of Boone and Turner. DNA evidence was collected from the bodies at this time.

On July 9, 1986, he overcame Kenneth Mayfield, a jailer, and escaped from the prison in Upshur County with Rosalie Williams, another guard, as a hostage. He was arrested two days later after the biggest fugitive hunt in Texas state history. In August 1986, he was sentenced to life imprisonment for the escape.
 
In July 1987, he was sentenced to death for the murder of 18-year-old Suzanne Harrison, 20-year-old Gena Turner and 19-year-old Bryan Boone. The Texas Appeals Court affirmed the conviction and sentence in November 1993. In October 1999, he was executed in the Huntsville Unit by lethal injection.

In January 2019, McFadden was linked by DNA via GEDmatch to the July 24, 1979 murder of Anna Marie Hlavka; Anna was found dead by her sister inside her apartment. Police said Hlavka had been sexually assaulted and strangled with the electric cord from her clock radio.

Timeline of crimes
Sentenced to 15 years in prison in 1973 for two counts of rape. Paroled in December 1978.
Committed the July 24, 1979, murder of Anna Marie Hlavka in Portland, Oregon. McFadden was not identified as the killer until January 2019 using genetic genealogy.
Convicted in 1979 of aggravated sexual assault for kidnapping and raping an 18-year-old woman at knifepoint. Paroled in July 1985, having served less than five years of a 15-year sentence.
Arrested in May 1986 for the rape and murder of 18-year-old high school cheerleader Suzanne Harrison and the murder of 20-year-old Gena Turner and 19-year old Bryan Boone who were shot.

See also 
 Capital punishment in Texas
 Capital punishment in the United States
 List of people executed in Texas, 1990–1999
 List of serial killers in the United States
 Parabon NanoLabs

Further reading

References

1948 births
1999 deaths
20th-century executions by Texas
20th-century American criminals
American male criminals
American people convicted of rape
Executed American serial killers
Male serial killers
People executed by Texas by lethal injection
People from Haskell County, Texas
Violence against women in the United States